Mr. Skitch is a 1933 American comedy film directed by James Cruze and written by Sonya Levien and Ralph Spence. The film stars Will Rogers, Rochelle Hudson, ZaSu Pitts, Florence Desmond, Harry Green and Charles Starrett. The film was released on December 22, 1933, by Fox Film Corporation.

Plot

Cast        
Will Rogers as Mr. Ira Skitch
Rochelle Hudson as Emily Skitch
ZaSu Pitts as Mrs. Maddie Skitch
Florence Desmond as Flo
Harry Green as Sam Cohen
Charles Starrett as Harvey Denby
Eugene Pallette as Cliff Merriweather

Reception
The film was one of Fox's biggest hits of the year.

References

External links 
 

1933 films
1930s English-language films
Fox Film films
American comedy films
1933 comedy films
Films directed by James Cruze
American black-and-white films
1930s American films